The W&H Group, a family company whose registered office is in Bürmoos, Austria, is one of the world's leading manufacturers of dental handpieces and turbines. Its products are used in dental practices, dental clinics, dental laboratories, dental universities, hospitals and microsurgery. W&H is involved principally in B2B business. 95% of its products are exported to over 90 countries.
The W&H Group employs around 980 staff worldwide, some 650 of whom work in the Austrian headquarters in Bürmoos. 30% of the Group's turnover comes from products that have come onto the market in the last three years.

Corporate history

W&H has a history of over 120 years in the manufacture of dental products:
The initials W&H refer to the Group's two founders, Jean Weber and Hugo Hampel. In 1890, these two precision engineers founded a company in Berlin for the manufacture of straight and contra-angle handpieces. The fact that the initials of the two founders are the same as the German initials of their products (Handstück and Winkelstück) was perhaps an added incentive to use the letters W&H as the central element of the company's logo.
The company was restructured several times between 1920 and 1930. W&H became part of DEGUSSA and acquired international status through its global sales network. In 1944, W&H moved from Berlin (Germany) to Bürmoos (Austria). In March 1946, the Allies installed Peter Malata to administer the company. In 1958, W&H was acquired by the family of Peter and Hilde Malata, since when it has been a family-owned concern. During the Seventies, the company began the steady rise and expansion through which it has achieved its current status as a global player. For example, W&H Germany opened in 1964, followed by branches in France, Italy, Sweden and Great Britain. Peter Malata junior has been the Group's CEO since 1996.

Products
W&H specialises in dental instruments and turbines. Its current product range includes instruments and turbines for the following fields of application:

• Dental restoration and prosthetics,

• endodontology,

• oral surgery & implantology,

• prophylaxis & parodontology,

• dental hygiene and care,

• dental laboratory.

Certificates such as the international ISO 9001 certificate, the ISO 13485 and Annex II of Directive 93/42/EEC are standard for W&H products. In 2007, quality Austria awarded W&H an environmental certificate under ISO 14001:2004.

From now on, the W&H Video Channel will be compiling all video uploads at video.wh.com, offering viewers a user-friendly and attractive internet experience.
Discover W&H Video Channel: https://video.wh.com/en_global/

Product history
1895: W&H manufactured a universal handpiece with adjustable head angle, to provide optimum access to the treatment site.

1926: The first file contra-angle headpiece manufactured by W&H, the Cursor, simplified mechanical root canal preparation.

1933: W&H engineer Roda was inspired to integrate a light source into W&H's instruments. The details can be seen from the technical records and old prototypes. However, the necessary light technology had not yet been developed.

1939: W&H developed its first foot-operated drilling machine. Using this machine, dental treatment procedures could be performed entirely independently of an electricity supply. The bur was rotated by pressing down on a pedal, in a similar way to an old sewing machine.

1959: The first portable drilling machine came onto the market, making on-the-spot treatments possible. Thanks to these drilling machines, bed-ridden patients could simply undergo treatment at home or in hospital.

1960: W&H developed its first turbine, the Turbo 60. These turbines had an integrated rapid heating function for water and air.

1978: The first Roto Quick coupling appeared on the market. It was possible to rotate the instruments through 360°, meaning that instruments could be changed more easily.

1979: The first press button chuck for turbines was introduced. For the first time, it was possible to change the bur by simply pressing a button on the back of the instrument head. Up to then, this procedure had required a bur changer.

1983: In 1983, W&H developed Elcomed, the most powerful and rapid device for minor operations of its day. The motor reached a drive speed of up to 45,000 rpm. With this instrument, W&H expanded its range in the area of oral surgery.

1989: W&H presented a unique Endo contra-angle handpiece. The movements of this instrument adjusted as it performed root canal preparations. The file therefore did not move in a fixed pattern. In this way, the Endo file was better able to follow the natural shape of the root canal.

1992: W&H launched the instrument maintenance system Assistina on the market.

1995: The quietest but most powerful turbine of its day, the 898 LE (low emission), was developed. The turbine's excellent power transmission meant that the idle mode speed could be reduced to 300,000 rpm.

2001: W&H developed an implantology motor for absolute precision in dental implants.

2007: The new Synea generation included the first turbines in the history of dentistry to be fitted with sterilizable LEDs. In order to make the benefits of LED technology accessible to all dentists, at the IDS 2007, W&H also introduced surgical handpieces/contra-angles with generator technology. The electricity for the light is generated independently of the drive motor by a generator which is integrated into the instrument. The principle is similar to that of a bicycle dynamo.

Branches
17 sales subsidiaries and a large number of partner companies in Europe, Asia, Australia, Africa, North and South America are responsible for customer support and technical customer service. The medical equipment is manufactured at two production locations in Bürmoos (Austria) and in a factory in Brusaporto (Italy).

Social commitment
W&H has received many awards for a variety of disciplines, ranging from employee training, through employee health to its commitment to social causes.
On the occasion of its 120th anniversary, W&H focused on the expansion of its commitment to social causes. Since its official anniversary year, from 6 April 2010 to 31 March 2011, W&H has been especially active in the provision of social services. In line with its corporate slogan People have Priority, W&H supports the organisation SOS Children's Villages.
W&H is offering special support to the family strengthening programme in Kakiri, Uganda, which was initiated by SOS. Thanks to this support, financing for the SOS programme has been guaranteed for around 3 years. The aim of the project is to help children and their families who rely on aid due to poverty and disease. Currently around 480 children from 130 families are taking part in the programme. The activities include: providing families with medical care, securing basic nutrition for them, and ensuring access to education for school-age children.

References

External links
Official Website
W&H Website for Students
W&H Video Channel
Dental Supplies

Dental companies
Dental equipment
Medical technology companies of Austria
Austrian brands